San Cibrao de Las hill fort  (Castro de San Cibrao de Las) is an archeological site in Galicia, Spain. It is a hill fort of the so-called castro culture. Rather than a single castle, it encompasses an entire fortified town or village. 

The place was  inhabited from the second century BC to the second century AD. It flourished during the first century, at the beginning of Roman rule in  Galicia.

The ruins are located on a 473-metre-high hill, covering an area 384 m long and 314 m wide. Unlike the other hill forts of the area, there are many straight walls and fewer curving structures.

References

External links 
 El castro de San Cibrao de Las dispone de una guía para divulgar su patrimonio arqueológico

Castro culture